Persona is a studio album by Italian rapper Marracash, released on 31 October 2019 by Island Records and Universal Music Italia. 
The album originally consisted of 15 tracks. The song "Neon - Le ali", written and performed with Italian singer Elisa, was also composed for the album, but it was not completed on time. Despite not being included on Persona, the track was released as a single in March 2020, and added to the track listing of Persona'''s streaming version.

Praised by Italian music critics, the album placed at number one on Rolling Stone Italia's list of the Best Albums of 2019. It also became a commercial success, spending six non-consecutive weeks atop the FIMI Italian Albums Chart.
After placing at number five on the Italian year-end albums chart of 2019, it also became the top-selling record of 2020 in Italy. As of January 2021, all its 15 original tracks, as well as "Neon - Le ali", were certified platinum in Italy, while the album was certified quadruple platinum by the Federation of the Italian Music Industry, denoting 200,000 equivalent album units.

Critical receptionPersona was very well received by several Italian music critics. Rockol.it gave the album a rating of 8 out of 10, highlighting Marracash' ability to describe his personal crisis while keeping himself far away from rap clichés, and praising the production's cohesion with lyrical content, as well as featured artists' connection with the view expressed by Marracash in its album. 
Federico Traversa described it as "one of the best rap albums of the last ten years", applauding its cultural depth.

Writing for the Italian version of GQ, Giuditta Avellina considered the album as a proof of Marracash still being "the King of Rap" in Italy. Ernesto Assante placed Persona among the 15 best Italian albums of 2019 on la Repubblica, describing it as "a perfect album, rap, hip hop, electronic music, sharp word and love lyrics". According to Rolling Stone Italia, it was the best Italian album of the year, with Marta Blumi Tripodi writing that "Persona'' was able to get everyone to agree and, most of all, to touch and emotionally involve everyone".

Track listing
Original tracklist

Streaming additional tracks

Charts

Weekly charts

Year-end charts

Certifications

References

2019 albums
Italian-language albums
Marracash albums
Island Records albums